Snide and Prejudice is a 1997 film directed by Philippe Mora.

Synopsis
At a mental institution, the resident physician, Dr Cohen, encourages his patients who believe that they are important Nazi figures to act out their fantasies. The therapy sessions show Hitler consolidating his power by assembling his gang of supporters; however, they are interrupted at times, once because Davidson's uniform is at the dry cleaners, and another time because a patient who believes he is Picasso interrupts a session.

Cast

Angus Macfadyen as Adolf Hitler/Michael Davidson
René Auberjonois as Dr. Sam Cohen
Sam Bottoms as Therapist Schaub 
Jeffrey Combs as Therapist Meissner 
Claudia Christian as Renate Müller
Mena Suvari as Geli Raubal
Brion James as Hermann Göring
Joseph Bottoms as Therapist Himmler
Richard Edson as Rudolf Hess
Richard Moll as General Von Ludendorf
Mick Fleetwood as Pablo Picasso
John Dennis Johnston (credit-J.D. Johnson) as Sheffield
Brian McDermott as Therapist Hindenberg
Ivan H. Migel as General Von Kahr
Patt Morrison as herself/The Interviewer
Jesse Grey Walken as Christ
T.C. Warner as Tessa Percival/Eva Braun
Michael Zelniker as Joseph Goebbels

References

External links

1997 films
1997 drama films
American drama films
Films directed by Philippe Mora
Films set in psychiatric hospitals
Cultural depictions of Adolf Hitler
1990s English-language films
1990s American films